Boiling Point (2012) was a professional wrestling Internet pay-per-view (iPPV) event produced by Ring of Honor (ROH) which took place on August 11, 2012 at the Rhode Island Convention Center in Providence, Rhode Island.

Storylines
Boiling Point featured professional wrestling matches involving different wrestlers from pre-existing feuds, plots, and story lines that played out on Ring of Honor's (ROH) television programs.

Results

References

External links
Official Boiling Point (2012) Page
Official Ring of Honor page

Ring of Honor pay-per-view events
Events in Providence, Rhode Island
2012 in Rhode Island
Professional wrestling in Providence, Rhode Island
August 2012 events in the United States
2012 Ring of Honor pay-per-view events